Teresa Kearney (Mother Kevin) CBE (1875–1957) was a teacher, Franciscan Sister, and missionary, who founded a new Franciscan order.  Born in Arklow, Ireland on April 28, 1875, she became a Junior Assistant Mistress at 17 and taught in Essex, England. On December 2, 1902, she left to begin missionary work in Nsambya, Uganda, working as a Franciscan Sister of Saint Mary's Abbey, Mill Hill, London.

In 1952 Kearney founded the Franciscan Missionary Sisters for Africa. Kearney's work in East Africa resulted in the formation of multiple hospitals and training of nurses throughout the region. Her name serves as the root of the word Kevina, which means "hospital" or "charity institute" in Uganda. On November 6, 2016, the Roman Catholic Diocese of Lugazi opened her formal beatification process, securing her the title Servant of God.

Early life

Family 
Teresa Kearney was born in Knockenrahan, Arklow, County Wicklow, on April 28, 1875 as the third daughter of farmer Michael Kearney and Teresa Kearney. Three months prior to Kearney's birth, her father died in an accident. Following his death, Kearney's mother remarried and had three more children. When Kearney was ten years old, her mother died. Her maternal grandmother, Grannie Grenell, then raised Kearney in Curranstown, County Wicklow. Grannie Grenell had a profound impact on Kearny's spiritual beliefs and deep faith. When Kearney was 17, Grannie Grenell died.

Education 
Kearney attended local convent school in Arklow following her mother's death. In 1889, following her grandmother's death, Kearney went to convent of Mercy at Rathdrum, to train as an assistant teacher. She did not have the finances to pay for training, and became a Junior Assistant Mistress. A year later, she went to teach in a school run by the Sisters of Charity in Essex.

Career

Early work 
Kearney became a Junior Assistant Mistress at 17 and taught in Essex, England.

Missionary work 
Following the death of her grandmother, Kearney turned toward thoughts of religious life. She believed that God was calling her to be a sister, and she applied for admission to the Franciscan Missionary Sisters of the Five Wounds at Mill Hill, London. In 1895, Kearney entered St Mary's Abbey, Mill Hill, London. On April 21, 1898 she took the name Sister Mary Kevin of the Sacred Passion. Her motto was "For Thee, Lord." She volunteered to work with African Americans in London. She waited three years for a posting to the American mission, but when the call from a foreign mission came, it came from Africa.

Path to Uganda 
On December 3, 1902, Kearney and five other sisters left London for Nsambya, Uganda. They were chosen at the request of Bishop Hanlon of the Mill Hill Fathers. The sisters arrived on January 15, 1903 and established a dispensary and school in the Buganda. "Their task was to care for the women and girls and to further weaken the association of Catholicism with French missionaries and Protestantism with British missionaries in the then British Protectorate." Among the sisters were three Irish, one American, one English, and one Scottish woman.

Kearney started her first clinic under a mango tree near the convent. The first seven years of missionary work were tough for the sisters. Various diseases, from smallpox to malaria, ravaged Buganda. The infant mortality rate was also relatively high due to the high frequency of maternal deaths. In 1906, Kearney expanded the missionary and set up a hospital in Nagalama, twenty-three miles away. Following Sister Paul's illness and return to the United States in 1910, Kearney was appointed the new superior of the convent. In 1913, three more sisters arrived, which allowed Kearney to establish a third mission station in Kamuli, Busoga. All three stations focused on medicine and education for the local population with a focus on primary and secondary education, training of nurses, and the founding of clinics, hospitals and orphanages.

Role in World War 1 
During World War 1, the Nsambya Hospital was used to treat the Native Carrier Corp, porters for European troops. At times, Kearney was outraged by the treatment Europeans gave to the African porters. She worked to uphold the rights of African people caught up in the European war.  On December 25, 1918 Kearney was awarded the MBE, Member of Order of British Empire, for her services to the wounded during the war years.

Promotion of female education 
Kearney is credited for promoting higher education in Catholic African women in her mission. In 1923, she founded the Little Sisters of St. Francis, a community of African nuns for teaching and nursing. This program started with only eight local girls. A year later, Kearney and Dr. Evelyn Connolly, a lay missionary, founded a nursing and midwifery school in Nsambya. Their goal was to promote the education of women throughout Uganda.

Creation of Franciscan Missionary Sisters for Africa 

In September 1928, Kearney returned to England to establish a novitiate exclusively for training sisters for African missions. The novitiate was officially opened in 1929 in Holme Hall, Yorkshire. Many women from England, Scotland and Ireland travelled to Holme Hall to assist the missionary efforts. This created a shortage for the Mill Hill Fathers, who also needed sisters for their school in England and American missions. Upon realization of this divide, Kearney and the Mill Hill Fathers broke off from each other. On June 9, 1952 the new congregation of the Franciscan Missionary Sisters for Africa was founded by Kearney. Kearney was appointed the first superior-general. Mount Oliver, Dundalk, became the motherhouse for this new congregation. With the formation of the FMSA, Kearney expanded the missionary work to Uganda, Kenya, Zambia, the US, Scotland, and South Africa.

Retirement 

Kearney retired in 1955 at age 80. During retirement, she was appointed Superior of a convent in Boston, Mass. and raised funds for African projects. She travelled and talked to donors to garner support for projects in Africa.

Death 
On October 17, 1957, Kearney died at the age of 82 in Brighton, Massachusetts. Her remains were flown to Ireland and buried at Mount Oliver. Ugandan Catholics rallied to have her body flown to Uganda to be buried. On December 3, 1957, Kearney's body was buried in the cemetery at Nkokonjeru, the motherhouse of the Little Sisters of St. Francis.

Legacy 

Kearney's legacy is evident today. In Uganda, the word Kevina means "hospital" or "charitable institute". The Mother Kevin Postgraduate Medical School was named after Mother Kevin (Teresa Kearney). The Little Sisters of St. Francis currently has over 500 members throughout Africa, while the Franciscan Missionary Sisters for Africa currently works in Uganda, Kenya, Zambia, Zimbabwe, and South Africa.

Awards 
In 1918, Kearney was made Member of the Order of the British Empire (MBE) for her work during the war.  In 1955 she received Commander of the Most Excellent Order of the British Empire (CBE), as well as Officer of the Most Excellent Order of the British Empire (OBE). In 1955, she was also awarded the Pro Ecclesia et Pontifice from Pious XI, for her Catholic work in Uganda.

References 

Irish Franciscans
Franciscan missionaries
Christian medical missionaries
Female Christian missionaries
Irish Roman Catholic missionaries
British Roman Catholic missionaries
Roman Catholic missionaries in Uganda
Commanders of the Order of the British Empire